Fee is a surname, usually an anglicized version of the Irish Ó Fiaich. The Chinese surname Fei is sometimes also transliterated as Fee. The French surname Fée, meaning fairy, is another less common source for this name in English.

Notable people with the surname include:

Albert Fee (1880–1957), Canadian provincial politician
Ben Fee (born 1908), Chinese American writer and labor organizer
Christopher R. Fee, American medievalist
Douglas Fee (born 1944), Canadian politician and businessman
Earl Fee (born 1929), Canadian track and field athlete
Francis Fee (born 1934), former Irish cricketer
Fra Fee (born 1987), Northern Irish actor
Gordon Fee (born 1934), American-Canadian theologian
Greg Fee (born 1964), former English footballer
Jack Fee (1867–1913), American baseball player
James Fee (1949–2006), American photographer
James Alger Fee (1888–1959), US federal judge
John Fee (politician) (1963–2007), Irish nationalist politician
John Gregg Fee (1816–1901), American minister, abolitionist, and educator
Margery Fee, Canadian academic and linguist
Mary Fee (born 1954), Scottish politician
Melinda O. Fee (born 1942), American actress
Michale Fee (born 1964), American scientist
Raymond Fee (1903–1983), American boxer
Thomas Fee (1931–2013), American politician
Thomas Arthur Fee (1860-1929), Canadian architect, partner in Parr and Fee
Iain Fee (born 1973), UK Radio Broadcaster on Jack Radio

See also
Fay (surname)
Feely
McFee
Feehan (name)

Surnames of Irish origin